Goosen is a common Afrikaans surname, meaning "son of Goos" ("Goswin"). Notable people with the surname include:

Anton Goosen (born 1946), South African musician and songwriter 
Frank Goosen (born 1966), German cabaret artist and author
Glenn Goosen (born 1982),  Zimbabwean cricketer 
Guy Goosen (born 1959), Zimbabwean swimmer
Hendrik Goosen (1904–1990), South African fishing captain, discoverer of the coelacanth
Jeanne Goosen (born 1938), South African journalist
Johan Goosen (born 1993), South African rugby player
Mathys Goosen (born 1996), Dutch swimmer
Retief Goosen (born 1969), South African golfer 
Quintin Goosen (1946–2014), Zimbabwean cricketer and umpire
Sammy Goosen (1892–?), South African cyclist
Wes Goosen (born 1995), South African-born, New Zealand rugby player

Republiek Goosen
Goosen was also the Dutch/Afrikaans name of the  State of Goshen (1882–83) in South Africa

See also
Goos (name)
Goossen, Dutch surname
Goossens, Dutch surname common in Belgium

Afrikaans-language surnames
Surnames of Dutch origin
Patronymic surnames